Wajira is a small genus of flowering plants in the legume family, Fabaceae. It belongs to the subfamily Faboideae. Species in this genus were formerly considered to belong to the genus Vigna. A key for the genus has been published.

References

Phaseoleae
Fabaceae genera